The 2017 German Athletics Championships was the 117th edition of the national championship in outdoor track and field for Germany. It was held on 8 and 9 July at the Steigerwaldstadion in Erfurt. It served as the selection meeting for Germany at the 2017 World Championships in Athletics.

Julian Reus claimed a sprint double in the men's 100 metres and 200 metres.

Championships
The annual national championships in Germany comprised the following competitions:

Cross Country: Löningen, 11 March
Half marathon: Hannover, 9 April
20 km walk: Naumburg, 23 April
10,000 m: Bautzen, 13 May
Mountain Run: Bayerisch Eisenstein, 10 June
100 km road race: Berlin, 24 June
Relays: Ulm, 6 August
Combined events: Kienbaum, 12–13 August
10K run: Bad Liebenzell, 3 September
Track walking: Diez, 16 September
50 km walk: Gleina, 14 October
Marathon: within the Frankfurt Marathon, 29 October

Results

Men

Women

References

External links 
 Official website of the Deutscher Leichtathletik-Verband (DLV; German Athletics Association) 

2017
German Athletics Championships
German Championships
Athletics Championships
Sport in Erfurt
2010s in Thuringia